The 2013 Hessian state election was held on 22 September 2013 to elect the members of the Landtag of Hesse. The election was held on the same day as the 2013 federal election. The incumbent coalition government of the Christian Democratic Union (CDU) and Free Democratic Party (FDP) led by Minister-President Volker Bouffier was defeated. The FDP suffered major losses, exceeding the 5% electoral threshold by under 1,000 votes. After the election, the CDU formed a coalition with The Greens, and Bouffier continued in office.

Parties
The table below lists parties represented in the previous Landtag of Hesse.

Opinion polling

Election result

|-
! colspan="2" | Party
! Votes
! %
! +/-
! Seats 
! +/-
! Seats %
|-
| bgcolor=| 
| align=left | Christian Democratic Union (CDU)
| align=right| 1,199,633
| align=right| 38.3
| align=right| 1.1
| align=right| 47
| align=right| 1
| align=right| 42.7
|-
| bgcolor=| 
| align=left | Social Democratic Party (SPD)
| align=right| 961,896
| align=right| 30.7
| align=right| 7.0
| align=right| 37
| align=right| 8
| align=right| 33.6
|-
| bgcolor=| 
| align=left | Alliance 90/The Greens (Grüne)
| align=right| 348,661
| align=right| 11.1
| align=right| 2.6
| align=right| 14
| align=right| 3
| align=right| 12.7
|-
| bgcolor=| 
| align=left | The Left (Linke)
| align=right| 161,488
| align=right| 5.2
| align=right| 0.2
| align=right| 6
| align=right| 0
| align=right| 5.5
|-
| bgcolor=| 
| align=left | Free Democratic Party (FDP)
| align=right| 157,451
| align=right| 5.0
| align=right| 11.2
| align=right| 6
| align=right| 14
| align=right| 5.5
|-
! colspan=8|
|-
| bgcolor=| 
| align=left | Alternative for Germany (AfD)
| align=right| 126,906
| align=right| 4.1
| align=right| New
| align=right| 0
| align=right| New
| align=right| 0
|-
| bgcolor=| 
| align=left | Pirate Party Germany (Piraten)
| align=right| 60,159
| align=right| 1.9
| align=right| 1.4
| align=right| 0
| align=right| ±0
| align=right| 0
|-
| 
| align=left | Free Voters (FW)
| align=right| 38,433
| align=right| 1.2
| align=right| 0.4
| align=right| 0
| align=right| ±0
| align=right| 0
|-
| bgcolor=|
| align=left | National Democratic Party (NPD)
| align=right| 33,433
| align=right| 1.1
| align=right| 0.2
| align=right| 0
| align=right| ±0
| align=right| 0
|-
| bgcolor=|
| align=left | Others
| align=right| 42,721
| align=right| 1.4
| align=right| 
| align=right| 0
| align=right| ±0
| align=right| 0
|-
! align=right colspan=2| Total
! align=right| 3,130,781
! align=right| 100.0
! align=right| 
! align=right| 110
! align=right| 8
! align=right| 
|-
! align=right colspan=2| Voter turnout
! align=right| 
! align=right| 73.2
! align=right| 12.2
! align=right| 
! align=right| 
! align=right| 
|}

References

External links
 Hessischer Landeswahlleiter
 Wahlumfragen zur Landtagswahl in Hessen (wahlrecht.de)

2013 elections in Germany
2013